Akhteruzzaman Elias (12 February 1943 – 4 January 1997) (Bengali: আখতারুজ্জামান ইলিয়াস) was a Bangladeshi novelist and short story writer. Despite writing only two novels, critics place Elias "in the pantheon of great Bengali novelists". Elias "emerged as a powerful short-story writer" in 1960s, and published his first novel, Chile Kotar Sepai in 1987 and his second and last Khowabnama in 1996 shortly before his death from cancer on 4 January 1997.

Early life and education
Elias was born at his maternal uncle's home in Gotia village in Gaibandha District. His paternal home was in Chelopara, near Bogra. His father, Badiuzzaman Muhammad Elias, was a member of the East Bengal Provincial Assembly and Parliamentary Secretary of the Muslim League. Elias' mother's name was Mariam Elias.

Elias completed his Matriculation from Bogra Zilla School in 1958, Intermediate from Dhaka College in 1960, and BA (Hons) and MA from the University of Dhaka in 1964.

Career
Elias started his career as a lecturer at Jagannath College and worked there till 1983. He also worked subsequently as Deputy Director, Directorate of Primary Education, Vice-Principal of Music College, and Professor and Head of the Department of Bengali at Dhaka College.

Death 
On 13 of January, 1996, Akhteruzzaman Elias was diagnosed of cancer. Delayed identification of the disease caused his situation to deteriorate. On 20 March of the same year, his right leg, affected by cancer, had to be cut off from his body. Suffering for a few days, he finally breathed his last breath on 4 January 1997 in Dhaka Community Hospital, Dhaka.

Works
Elias is said to not have focused on the quantity of his literary output, rather on the quality. His literary work includes themes such as the country's history, heritage, culture, politics, economics, poverty, exploitation, and deprivation. He is said to have tried to comprehend human life as a whole through these themes. Elias has been praised on his ability to portray subtle mental tendencies.

Below are listed his notable works.

Novels

Chilekothar Sepai /চিলেকোঠার সেপাই (The Soldier in the Attic) (1987) - details the psychological journey of a man during the turbulent period of the mass uprisings of 1969, just prior to Bangladeshi independence in 1971. This novel also contains what is arguably the most authentic description of life in Puran Dhaka, the old and distinctive part of Dhaka.
Khoabnama/খোয়াবনামা (The Saga of Dreams) (1996) - Khoabnama depicts the socio-political scene in rural pre-partition Bangladesh.

Short story collections

Dojokher Om/ দোজখের ওম (The Warmth of Hell)
 Dudhbhate Utpat/ দুধভাতে উৎপাত (No Peace in Milk and Rice)
 Onno Ghore Onno Shor/ অন্য ঘরে অন্য স্বর (Another Tune in Another Room)
 Khoari/ খোয়ারি (Hangover)
 Jal Shopno, Shopner Jal/ জাল স্বপ্ন, স্বপ্নের জাল (Fake Dream, Illusion of Dream)

Essay collections

 Shongskritir Bhanga Shetu/ সংস্কৃতির ভাঙা সেতু (Broken Bridge of Culture)

Awards
 1977 : Humayun Kabir Smrti Puraskar
 1983 : Bangla Academy Literary Award in Literature
 1987 : Alaol Sahitya Puraskar - Chilekothar Sepai
 1996 : Ananda Puraskar - Khwabnama
 1996 : Saadat Ali Akhand Puraskar  - Khwabnama
 1996 : Kazi Mahbubullah Gold Medal - Khwabnama
 1999 : Ekushey Padak (posthumous)

References

External links
 Akhtaruzzaman Elias Intermingles Dreams, Myths and Realities

Bengali-language writers
Bengali novelists
Bangladeshi male novelists
1943 births
1997 deaths
Academic staff of Dhaka College
Dhaka College alumni
University of Dhaka alumni
Recipients of Bangla Academy Award
Recipients of the Ananda Purashkar
Recipients of the Ekushey Padak
20th-century novelists
People from Bogra District
20th-century Bangladeshi male writers
People from Gaibandha District
Magic realism writers